Chelis mongolica is a species of tiger moth in the family Erebidae, described by Sergei Alphéraky in 1888. It is found in the Gobi Desert and neighboring arid territories.

The larvae feed on Artemisia sieversiana.

This species was moved from the genus Centrarctia to Chelis as a result of phylogenetic research published in 2016.

References

External links
Natural History Museum Lepidoptera generic names catalog

Arctiina
Monotypic moth genera
Moths of Asia